Spotted house gecko may refer to:
 Gekko monarchus
 Hemidactylus brookii
 Hemidactylus parvimaculatus